The Canadian Institute for Advanced Research (CIFAR) is a Canadian-based global research organization that brings together teams of top researchers from around the world to address important and complex questions. It was founded in 1982 and is supported by individuals, foundations and corporations, as well as funding from the Government of Canada and the provinces of Alberta, British Columbia, Ontario and Quebec.

Operations
CIFAR staff supports more than 400 researchers from 22 countries and more than 130 institutions. Approximately half of the researchers are based in Canada and half are located abroad. The President and CEO is directly responsible to the Chair and the Board of Directors, who are responsible for funding allocation and approval of research programs. In May 2012, Alan Bernstein became president and CEO. William L. Young is the chair of CIFAR's Board of Directors. CIFAR receives funding from a blend of governments, partnerships (research organizations and universities), private sector (corporations, foundations and individuals) and investment income. CIFAR's annual budget in 2018 was $30M. In 2017, CIFAR was chosen to develop and lead the Pan-Canadian Artificial Intelligence Strategy.

Research programs
As of 2019, CIFAR supports research in 13 major multidisciplinary areas, grouped into four themes:

Individuals & Society

 Boundaries, Membership & Belonging (established 2019)
 Innovation, Equity & the Future of Prosperity (established 2019)
 Azrieli Program in Brain, Mind & Consciousness (established 2014)
 Child & Brain Development (formerly known as Experience-based Brain and Biological Development, established 2003)

Life & Health

 Fungal Kingdom: Threats & Opportunities (established 2019)
 Humans & the Microbiome (established 2014)

Earth & Space

 Earth 4D: Subsurface Science & Exploration (established 2019)
 Gravity & the Extreme Universe (established 1986)

Information & Matter

 Bio-inspired Solar Energy (established 2014)
 Learning in Machines & Brains (formerly known as Neural Computation & Adaptive Perception, established 2004)
 Quantum Information Science (established 2002)
 Quantum Materials (established 1987)

Past programs:

 Artificial Intelligence and Robotics (formerly known as Artificial Intelligence, Robotics and Society, established 1983, closed 1995)
 Population Health (established 1983, closed 2003)
 Evolutionary Biology (established 1986, closed 2007)
 Laws and the Determinants of Social Order (established 1986, closed 1996)
 Economic Growth and Policy (established 1991, closed 2002)
 Earth System Evolution (established 1992, closed 2014) 
 Human Development (established 1993, closed 2003)
 Science of Soft Surfaces and Interfaces (established 1993, closed 2000)
 Nanoelectronics (established 1999, closed 2013)
 Genetic Networks (established 2002, closed 2020)
 Successful Societies (established 2002, closed 2019)
 Institutions, Organizations & Growth (established 2004, closing 2020)
 Social Interactions, Identity & Well-Being (established 2005, closed 2017)
 Integrated Microbial Biodiversity (established 2007, closed 2017)
 Molecular Architecture of Life (established 2014, closing 2020)

Process
CIFAR (pronounced "see-far") works with researchers around the world to identify major new areas of scholarship where Canada has the potential to lead. The organization assembles diverse groups of scholars in its programs, many of whom are established leaders in their fields, and others who are promising early-career researchers.

The CIFAR research model relies on deep collaboration at regular program meetings. These meetings bring together researchers from different countries, institutions, disciplines and levels of experience, who might not otherwise meet.

By building long-term, interdisciplinary, global communities, CIFAR provides researchers with an environment of trust that inspires risk-taking and new directions of inquiry.

Each research program also develops a knowledge mobilization strategy that includes roundtables, panel discussions, and workshops to bring researchers together with experts outside academia in order to enrich research and stimulate social, economic and technical innovations.

Periodically, CIFAR will refresh its portfolio by initiating a Global Call for Ideas and inviting the global research community to submit proposals for new programs that address complex, fundamental questions of importance to the world. After a rigorous process involving workshops, interviews and consultations with expert panels, new programs are selected. Programs are run on five-year renewal cycles.

History
CIFAR was founded in 1982. The original idea for an institute for advanced studies came from John Leyerle, a professor of English and dean of the School of Graduate Studies at the University of Toronto who began rallying support for the concept in 1978. The centre would serve to "foster basic, conceptual research of high quality at an advanced level across the full spectrum of knowledge in the humanities, social sciences, natural sciences and life sciences." Fraser Mustard, a medical doctor and researcher in early childhood development, was appointed as founding president of CIFAR in January 1982. The first 25 years of its history is covered in the book A Generation of Excellence by Craig Brown.

CIFAR fellows published several papers in 1994, including "Why are some people healthy and others not", that argued policies driven by population health could address health disparities. They named 10 determinants of health, listing socio-economic status as the most influential. The government adopted the term population health and renamed a branch of the Public Health Agency of Canada "Population and Public Health."

In 2004, Geoffrey Hinton began leading CIFAR's Neural Computation & Adaptive Perception program. Its members included Yoshua Bengio and Yann LeCun, among other neuroscientists, computer scientists, biologists, electrical engineers, physicists, and psychologists. Together, they confirmed Hinton's conviction about the power of neural networks when they created computing systems that mimicked human intelligence. Today, the three are widely acknowledged as the pioneers of deep learning. In 2019, the Association for Computing Machinery (ACM), named Hinton, Bengio and LeCun as recipients of the 2018 ACM A.M. Turing Award for conceptual and engineering breakthroughs that have made deep neural networks a critical component of computing.

In April 2012, the United Nations Sustainable Development Solutions Network published the first World Happiness Report co-authored by CIFAR Senior Fellow John F. Helliwell at the University of British Columbia; Lord Richard Layard, Director of the Well-Being Programme at LSE's Centre for Economic Performance; and Professor Jeffrey Sachs, Director of The Earth Institute at Columbia University, Director of the SDSN, and Special Advisor to the UN Secretary General.

In 2017, the Government of Canada renewed and enhanced its funding for CIFAR, investing $35 million over the next five years. The government also announced that CIFAR will administer a $125 million Pan-Canadian Artificial Intelligence Strategy for research and talent.
 
Since the institute's inception, 20 Nobel laureates have been associated with CIFAR.

 George A. Akerlof
 Sidney Altman
 Philip W. Anderson
 Kenneth Arrow
 Willard Boyle
 Walter Gilbert
 Leland H. Hartwell
 Daniel Kahneman
 Brian Kobilka
 Robert B. Laughlin
 Anthony J. Leggett
 Art McDonald
 Roger B. Myerson
 James Peebles
 John C. Polanyi
 Richard J. Roberts
 Paul Romer
 Michael Smith
 Eric Wieschaus
 David Wineland

See also
 Canadian government scientific research organizations
 Canadian university scientific research organizations
 Canadian industrial research and development organizations

Notes

External links
 Canadian Institute for Advanced Research

Organizations established in 1982
1982 establishments in Ontario
Research institutes in Canada